Thiruvalluvar Award is an annual award given by the State Government of Tamil Nadu, India, in memory of the ancient poet-philosopher Valluvar. It is given to those who have made an outstanding contribution towards the Kural literature and its philosophy. It is given in January of every year since 1986, on the 2nd day of the Tamil month of Thai observed by the Tamil Nadu government as the Thiruvalluvar Day, and is given on behalf of Tamil Development Authority.

The award
The award carries a cash prize of  100,000, a 1-sovereign gold medal, and a citation. The award originally included a cash prize of  10,000. From 1991, the prize amount was increased to  20,000. From 1999, the prize amount was again increased to the current measure of  100,000.

Recipients

See also
 Kural Peedam Award

Citations

References

External links
 Official site of the Government of Tamil Nadu Awards

Tirukkural
Memorials to Valluvar
Tamil culture
1986 establishments in Tamil Nadu
Awards established in 1986
Civil awards and decorations of India
Lists of Indian award winners
Indian awards
Tamil Nadu awards